Daron Jae Cruickshank (born June 11, 1985) is an American mixed martial artist currently competing as a lightweight for the Xtreme Fighting Championships. A professional competitor since 2008, Cruickshank has also formerly competed for the UFC, King of the Cage and was a competitor on The Ultimate Fighter: Live.

Background
Originally from Westland, Michigan, Cruickshank began training in combat sports from a young age. Both of Cruickshank's parents are fourth degree black belts in Taekwondo who ran their own schools. Cruickshank's father is a former mixed martial artist with multiple black belts, while Cruickshank's mother is also a former professional competitor in kickboxing and boxing. Cruickshank is a second degree black belt in Taekwondo and was also a talented wrestler, having competed in wrestling and also swimming since he was in the eighth grade. Cruickshank went to wrestle collegiately, and was a NJCAA national finalist as well as a two-time NCAA Division III national qualifier at Olivet College where he earned a bachelor's degree in fitness management.

Mixed martial arts career

Early career
Cruickshank made his amateur debut in August 2008 where he defeated Tom Grisham via KO at XCC 11: Duel in Downriver 2. He then went on to compile an amateur record of 8-1 while capturing two titles.

King of the Cage
In Cruickshank's professional debut he fought Ricky Stettner at KOTC: Strike Point where he won by first-round KO.

Cruickshank fought Bobby Green at KOTC: Imminent Danger for the Junior Welterweight Championship but lost by a guillotine choke in round 2.

Bellator Fighting Championships
On July 12, 2011, it was announced that Cruickshank signed a contract with Bellator Fighting Championships to fight on their upcoming Summer Series card on July 23. He was to fight Lithuanian fighter Sergej Juskevic but the fight was scrapped at the last minute.

The Ultimate Fighter
Cruickshank competed on The Ultimate Fighter: Live beginning in March, 2012.  In the elimination fight, he defeated Drew Dober by unanimous decision to get into the TUF house.  Cruickshank was selected third (sixth overall) by Urijah Faber to be part of his team.  In the first fight on the show, Cruickshank was chosen to face James Vick of Team Cruz.  Despite controlling much of the action in the opening round, Cruickshank was knocked out with a knee on a takedown attempt.

Ultimate Fighting Championship
Cruickshank faced fellow cast member Chris Tickle on June 1, 2012 at The Ultimate Fighter 15 Finale. He won the fight via unanimous decision.

Cruickshank was expected to face Henry Martinez on September 1, 2012 at UFC 151.  However, after UFC 151 was cancelled, Cruickshank/Martinez was rescheduled and took place on December 8, 2012 at UFC on Fox 5.  He won the fight via spectacular knockout in the second round.

Cruickshank next faced John Makdessi on March 16, 2013 at UFC 158. He lost the fight via unanimous decision.  In the final 10 seconds of the Makdessi fight, Cruickshank had his nose badly injured and wound up having surgery to repair what his doctor called "the worst thing he's ever seen."  He underwent the surgery in May 2013.

Cruickshank faced off against Yves Edwards on July 27, 2013 at UFC on Fox 8, replacing an injured Spencer Fisher.  He won the fight via split decision in a closely contested fight.

Cruickshank faced Adriano Martins on November 9, 2013 at UFC Fight Night 32.  Martins defeated Cruckshank via submission in the second round.

Cruickshank faced Mike Rio on January 25, 2014 at UFC on Fox 10.  He won the fight by wheel kick to the face and punches at 4:56 of the second round.

Cruickshank faced Erik Koch on May 10, 2014 at UFC Fight Night 40. Cruickshank, a significant betting underdog, won the fight via TKO due to a kick and punches in the first round.

Cruickshank faced Jorge Masvidal on July 26, 2014 at UFC on Fox 12. He lost the fight via unanimous decision.

Cruickshank faced Anthony Njokuani on October 4, 2014 at UFC Fight Night: MacDonald vs. Saffiedine. He won the fight by unanimous decision.

Cruickshank faced K. J. Noons on December 12, 2014 at The Ultimate Fighter 20 Finale. After a back-and-forth first round, the fight was stopped in the second round when Cruickshank received a second inadvertent eye poke from Noons and was unable to continue. Because they had not reached the third round, the fight was declared a No Contest.

Cruickshank faced Beneil Dariush on March 14, 2015 at UFC 185. Cruickshank missed weight on his first attempt at the weigh ins, coming in at 157.5 pounds. He was given additional time to make the lightweight limit, but missed weight again, coming in at 157 pounds. Subsequently, he was fined 20 percent of his purse, which went to Dariush. He lost the fight via submission in the second round.

Cruickshank faced James Krause on July 25, 2015 at UFC on Fox 16. He lost the fight by submission in the first round.

Cruickshank faced Paul Felder on January 17, 2016 at UFC Fight Night 81. He lost the fight via submission in the third round.

After losing three straight fights Cruickshank was released from his UFC contract on March 1, 2016.

Rizin FF
In March 2016, it was announced that Cruickshank had signed with Rizin Fighting Federation. He made his debut against Shinji Sasaki on April 17, 2016 and won the fight via TKO due to soccer kicks in the first round.

In his second fight for the promotion, Cruickshank faced Dutch kickboxer Andy Souwer on September 25, 2016. He won the fight via submission due to a rear-naked choke in the first round.

Cruickshank was expected to face Chris Brown at WXC 77 on April 24, 2019. However, Brown missed the contracted weight and Cruickshank declined to proceed to the bout.

Cruickshank faced Tofiq Musayev at Rizin 16 - Kobe on June 2, 2019. He lost the fight via unanimous decision.

Cruickshank faced Goiti Yamauchi at Bellator & Rizin: Japan on December 29, 2019. He lost the fight via a rear-naked choke submission in the first round.

Post Rizin 
While still being under contract with Rizin but unable to enter Japan due to the COVID-19 pandemic, Cruickshank signed a one-fight contract with Taura MMA. In his promotional debut he faced Deivison Ribeiro at Taura MMA 11 on October 30, 2020. He won the fight via unanimous decision.

Cruickshank faced Guilherme Faria on August 6, 2021 at XFC 45. He lost the bout via split decision.

Personal life
In 2013, he founded Michigan Top Team in co-operation with Jason Fischer.

Mixed martial arts record

|-
|Loss
|align=center|23–14 (1)
|Guilherme Faria
|Decision (split)
|XFC 45
|
|align=center|3
|align=center|5:00
|Grand Rapids, Michigan, United States
|
|-
|Win
|align=center|23–13 (1)
|Deivison Ribeiro
|Decision (unanimous)
|Taura MMA 11
|
|align=center| 3
|align=center| 5:00
|Kissimmee, Florida, United States
|
|-
|Loss
|align=center|22–13 (1)
|Goiti Yamauchi
|Submission (rear-naked choke)
|Bellator & Rizin: Japan
|
|align=center| 1
|align=center| 3:11
|Saitama, Japan
|
|-
|Loss
|align=center|22–12 (1)
|Tofiq Musayev
|Decision (unanimous)
|Rizin 16
|
|align=center|3
|align=center|5:00
|Kobe, Japan
|
|-
|Loss
|align=center|22–11 (1)
|Damien Brown
|Submission (guillotine choke)
|Rizin 14
|
|align=center|1
|align=center|4:19
|Saitama, Japan
|
|-
|Win
|align=center|22–10 (1)
|Diego Brandao
|KO (flying knee)
|Rizin 13
|
|align=center|2
|align=center|0:17
|Saitama, Japan
|
|-
|Win
|align=center|21–10 (1)
|Tom Santos
|TKO (elbows)
|Rizin 11
|
|align=center|3
|align=center|4:11
|Saitama, Japan
|
|-
|Win
|align=center|20–10 (1)
|Koshi Matsumoto
|KO (head kick)
|Rizin 10
|
|align=center|1
|align=center|3:58
|Fukuoka, Japan
|
|-
|Win
|align=center|19–10 (1)
|Alexander Trevino
|TKO (punches)
|KnockOut Promotions 58
|
|align=center|1
|align=center|2:02
|Grand Rapids, Michigan, United States
|Catchweight (160 lbs) bout.
|-
|Loss
|align=center|18–10 (1)
|Yusuke Yachi
|KO (punch)
|Rizin 5: Sakura
|
|align=center|1
|align=center|5:10
|Yokohama, Japan
|
|-
| Loss
| align=center|18–9 (1)
| Satoru Kitaoka
| Technical Submission (guillotine choke)
| Rizin World Grand-Prix 2016: 2nd Round
| 
| align=center| 1
| align=center| 8:18
| Saitama, Japan
| 
|-
|Win
|align=center|18–8 (1)
|Andy Souwer
|Submission (rear-naked choke)
|Rizin World Grand-Prix 2016: 1st Round
|
|align=center|1
|align=center|4:10
|Saitama, Japan
|
|-
|Win
|align=center|17–8 (1)
|Shinji Sasaki
|TKO (soccer kicks)
|Rizin Fighting Federation 1
|
|align=center|1
|align=center|4:36
|Nagoya, Japan
|  
|-
|Loss
|align=center|16–8 (1)
|Paul Felder
|Submission (rear-naked choke)
|UFC Fight Night: Dillashaw vs. Cruz
|
|align=center|3
|align=center|3:56
|Boston, Massachusetts, United States
|    
|-
| Loss
| align=center| 16–7 (1)
| James Krause
| Submission (rear-naked choke)
| UFC on Fox: Dillashaw vs. Barão 2
| 
| align=center| 1
| align=center| 1:27
| Chicago, Illinois, United States
| 
|-
| Loss
| align=center| 16–6 (1)
| Beneil Dariush
| Submission (rear-naked choke)
| UFC 185
| 
| align=center| 2
| align=center| 2:48
| Dallas, Texas, United States
| 
|-
| NC
| align=center| 16–5 (1)
| K. J. Noons
| NC (accidental eye poke)
| The Ultimate Fighter: A Champion Will Be Crowned Finale
| 
| align=center| 2
| align=center| 0:25
| Las Vegas, Nevada, United States
| 
|-
| Win
| align=center| 16–5
| Anthony Njokuani
| Decision (unanimous)
| UFC Fight Night: MacDonald vs. Saffiedine
| 
| align=center| 3
| align=center| 5:00
| Halifax, Nova Scotia, Canada
| 
|-
| Loss
| align=center| 15–5
| Jorge Masvidal
| Decision (unanimous)
| UFC on Fox: Lawler vs. Brown
| 
| align=center| 3
| align=center| 5:00
| San Jose, California, United States
| 
|-
| Win
| align=center| 15–4
| Erik Koch
| TKO (head kick and punches)
| UFC Fight Night: Brown vs. Silva
| 
| align=center| 1
| align=center| 3:21
| Cincinnati, Ohio, United States
| 
|-
| Win
| align=center| 14–4
| Mike Rio
| TKO (wheel kick and punches)
| UFC on Fox: Henderson vs. Thomson
| 
| align=center| 2
| align=center| 4:56
| Chicago, Illinois, United States
| 
|-
| Loss
| align=center| 13–4
| Adriano Martins
| Submission (straight armbar)
| UFC Fight Night: Belfort vs. Henderson
| 
| align=center| 2
| align=center| 2:49
| Goiânia, Brazil
| 
|-
| Win
| align=center| 13–3
| Yves Edwards
| Decision (split)
| UFC on Fox: Johnson vs. Moraga
| 
| align=center| 3
| align=center| 5:00
| Seattle, Washington, United States
| 
|-
| Loss
| align=center| 12–3
| John Makdessi
| Decision (unanimous)
| UFC 158
| 
| align=center| 3
| align=center| 5:00
| Montreal, Quebec, Canada
| 
|-
| Win
| align=center| 12–2
| Henry Martinez
| KO (head kick)
| UFC on Fox: Henderson vs. Diaz
| 
| align=center| 2
| align=center| 2:57
| Seattle, Washington, United States
| 
|-
| Win
| align=center| 11–2
| Chris Tickle
| Decision (unanimous)
| The Ultimate Fighter: Live Finale
| 
| align=center| 3
| align=center| 5:00
| Las Vegas, Nevada, United States
| 
|-
| Win
| align=center| 10–2
| Jesse Gross
| TKO (punches and elbows)
| Score Fighting Series 3
| 
| align=center| 1
| align=center| 1:39
| Sarnia, Ontario, Canada
| 
|-
| Win
| align=center| 9–2
| Mike Ricci
| Decision (unanimous)
| Ringside MMA 12
| 
| align=center| 5
| align=center| 5:00
| Montreal, Quebec, Canada
| 
|-
| Win
| align=center| 8–2
| Brad Cardinal
| TKO (punches)
| Slammer in the Hammer  
| 
| align=center| 1
| align=center| 4:35
| Hamilton, Ontario, Canada
| 
|-
| Win
| align=center| 7–2
| Tiawan Howard
| Decision (split)
| Bobish's Ultimate Cage Battles: Stars and Stripes  
| 
| align=center| 3
| align=center| 5:00
| Parma, Ohio, United States
| 
|-
| Loss
| align=center| 6–2
| Luis Palomino
| KO (head kick and punches)
| G-Force Fights: Bad Blood 5 
| 
| align=center| 1
| align=center| 3:52
| Grand Rapids, Michigan, United States
| 
|-
| Win
| align=center| 6–1
| Anthony Smith
| TKO (punches)
| KOTC: Civil War 2
| 
| align=center| 1
| align=center| 1:52
| Royal Oak, Michigan, United States
| 
|-
| Loss
| align=center| 5–1
| Bobby Green
| Submission (guillotine choke)
| KOTC: Imminent Danger
| 
| align=center| 2
| align=center| 2:39
| Mescalero, New Mexico, United States
| 
|-
| Win
| align=center| 5–0
| Jason Holmes
| Decision (split)
| KOTC: Bad Boys II
| 
| align=center| 3
| align=center| 5:00
| Detroit, Michigan, United States
| 
|-
| Win
| align=center| 4–0
| Raul Mandez
| KO (punches)
| KOTC: Upper Cut
| 
| align=center| 1
| align=center| 2:19
| Laughlin, Nevada, United States
| 
|-
| Win
| align=center| 3–0
| Dominic Deshazor
| TKO (punches)
| XCC: Beatdown at the Ballroom 9 
| 
| align=center| 1
| align=center| 1:25
| Mt. Clemens, Michigan, United States
| 
|-
| Win
| align=center| 2–0
| Brett Biederman
| Submission (rear-naked choke)
| XCC: Rumble in Royal Oak 5 
| 
| align=center| 2
| align=center| 2:58
| Royal Oak, Michigan, United States
| 
|-
| Win
| align=center| 1–0
| Ricky Stettner
| KO (spinning back fist)
| KOTC: Strike Point
| 
| align=center| 1
| align=center| 2:23
| Lac du Flambeau, Wisconsin, United States
|

Mixed martial arts exhibition record

|-
| Loss
| align=center| 1–1
| James Vick
| KO (knee) 
| The Ultimate Fighter: Live
|  (airdate)
| align=center| 1
| align=center| 2:16
| Las Vegas, Nevada, United States
| 
|-
| Win
| align=center| 1–0
| Drew Dober
| Decision (unanimous) 
| The Ultimate Fighter: Live
|  (airdate)
| align=center| 1
| align=center| 5:00
| Las Vegas, Nevada, United States
|

See also
 List of male mixed martial artists

References

External links
 
 

American male mixed martial artists
Mixed martial artists from Michigan
Mixed martial artists utilizing taekwondo
Mixed martial artists utilizing collegiate wrestling
Living people
1985 births
People from Westland, Michigan
American male taekwondo practitioners
American male sport wrestlers
People from Wayne, Michigan
Olivet Comets wrestlers
Ultimate Fighting Championship male fighters